Burg Neudenstein is a castle in Carinthia, Austria. Burg Neudenstein is situated at a height of 439 m.

See also
List of castles in Austria

References

This article was initially translated from the German Wikipedia.

Castles in Carinthia (state)